Sirisak Fufung (born August 18, 1990) is a Thai professional footballer who plays as a left winger for Asawin Kohkwang United in the Thai League 3.

References

External links
 at Soccerway

1990 births
Living people
Sirisak Fufung
Association football midfielders
Sirisak Fufung
Sirisak Fufung
Sirisak Fufung